Mohammed Ahmed Jama (born 5 August 1985), commonly known as Mohammed Ahamed or just Mo, is a retired professional footballer, who played as a forward.

Ahamed was born in Burao, Somaliland. However, he emigrated to Norway.

Career
After playing for Fløya's first-team, he moved to Tromsdalen in 2006, and he was bought by the Tippeligaen-side Tromsø in 2009. During Tromsø IL's Europa League qualification play off, Ahamed scored in the 5-0 first leg defeat of Latvian club Daugava Daugavpils. He played a total of 45 matches and scored three goals for Tromsø in Tippeligaen, with all the goals coming in 2010.

He was loaned out from Tromsø to Sarpsborg 08 from 1 August 2011 till the end of the season. On 8 August 2012, Ahamed joined his old club Tromsdalen on a free transfer.

In 2019, Ahamed returned to his mother club Krokelvdalen IL.

Career statistics

Club

References

External links
 UEFA profile

1985 births
Living people
Norwegian footballers
Tromsdalen UIL players
Tromsø IL players
Sarpsborg 08 FF players
Eliteserien players
Norwegian First Division players
Norwegian Second Division players
Expatriate footballers in Norway
Somalian emigrants to Norway

Association football forwards